The Muscatine Arboretum (12 acres) is an arboretum in the 85-acre Discovery Park in Muscatine, Iowa, adjacent to the Muscatine Environmental Learning Center at 3300 Cedar Street.  Access is through the Learning Center or from Houser Street via Harmony Lane.

External links
Muscatine Arboretum Association
Discovery Park, Muscatine

See also 
 List of botanical gardens in the United States

Arboreta in Iowa
Botanical gardens in Iowa
Protected areas of Muscatine County, Iowa
Muscatine, Iowa